Tawana Lenae McDonald (born January 5, 1980) is an American former basketball player who was selected in the first round of the 2002 WNBA Draft.

College
McDonald compiled 297 career blocks, a Georgia-then record.

Georgia statistics

Source

Awards, honors, and highlights

College
All-SEC First Team (2000) 
All-SEC Second Team (2000, 2001)
All-SEC Third Team (2001)
Women's Basketball Journal Defensive All-America Second Team (2001)
Led SEC in blocked shots in first three seasons and ranked fourth as a senior, finishing career with 2.4 bpg
Set Georgia all-time record for blocked shots (297) and single-season record (103) in 2001

References

External links
Tawana McDonald - College stats
Lis of professional basketball players from Michigan high schools (1967 - 2001)

1980 births
Living people
Basketball players from Flint, Michigan
Centers (basketball)
Georgia Lady Bulldogs basketball players
Indiana Fever draft picks